The corpus, also body or shaft of the penis, is the free portion of the human penis that is located outside of the pelvic cavity. It is the continuation of the internal root or radix which is embedded in the pelvis and extends to the glans behind which lies the neck of the penis. It is made up of the two corpora cavernosa and the corpus spongiosum on the underside. The corpora cavernosa are intimately bound to one another with a dorsally fenestrated septum which becomes a complete one before the penile crura.

Anatomy 
The corpus of the penis is suspended from the pubic symphysis. As the extension of the root, it is made up of three cylindrical bodies; the corpora cavernosa and the corpus spongiosum which are continuations of the crura and the bulb of the penis respectively. It has two surfaces; the dorsal and the ventral or urethral. The penile raphe runs on its ventral surface.

The corpus is surrounded by a bi-layered model of tunica albuginea in which a distal ligament buttresses the glans penis and plays an integral role to the penile fibroskeleton, and the structure is called "os analog," a term coined by Geng Long Hsu in the Encyclopedia of Reproduction. This indispensable structure is a continuation of the body of human penis, differing from other mammalian penis, in that it has no baculum (or erectile bone) and instead relies exclusively on engorgement with blood to reach its erect state. It is a remnant of baculum evolved likely due to change in mating practice. 

A shallow groove which marks their junction on the upper surface lodges the deep dorsal vein of the penis which is flanked by a pair of cavernosal veins of the penis, while a deeper and wider groove between them on the surface below contains the corpus spongiosum. The body is ensheathed by fascia which includes tunica albuginea, Buck's fascia, dermis, and skin.

See also 

 Root of penis

Additional Images

References 

Mammal male reproductive system
Human penis anatomy